Falling Up is the thirteenth studio album by Kevin Ayers, released on Virgin Records in 1988.

The song "Flying Start" was first released on the Mike Oldfield album Islands in September 1987.

Track listing
 "(Another) Saturday Night (In Deya)" (Kevin Ayers, Peter Halsall) – 4:02
 "Flying Start" (Mike Oldfield) – 3:38
 "The Best We Have" (Ayers, Halsall) – 3:29
 "Another Rolling Stone" (Ayers, Marvin Siau) – 5:17
 "Do You Believe" (Ayers) – 5:54
 "That's What We Did (Today)" (Ayers, Halsall) – 3:44
 "Night Fighters" (Ayers, Halsall) – 4:58
 "Am I Really Marcel?" (Ayers) – 5:59

In the songwriting credits, Ollie Halsall's real name, Peter, is used.

Personnel

Musicians
 Kevin Ayers – guitar, vocals, harmonica, percussion
 Ollie Halsall – guitar, keyboards, drums, bass, backing vocals
 Luis Dulzaides – congas
 Marcelo Fuentes – bass
 Javier Paxariño – soprano saxophone
 Ñete (Antonio Martín-Caruana) – drums
 Tony Vázquez – drums, bongos
 Pablo Salinas – piano
 Miguel Herrero – guitars
 El Reverendo – Hammond organ
 Charles J. Beale, Chuck "C' Note" Brown, Patrick Patterson, Andrea Bronston, Mary Jamison – backing vocals

Technical
 Colin Fairley – producer
 Eugenio Muñoz – engineer
 David De La Torre – assistant engineer
Oscar Mariné - artwork
Jordi Socías - photography

References

Original LP sleevenotes

1988 albums
Kevin Ayers albums
Virgin Records albums